McClintic Sphere is a fictional character in the novel V. by Thomas Pynchon.

Sphere is an innovative saxophone player modeled on Ornette Coleman, though Sphere is also Thelonious Monk's middle name.

V. contains a description of a gig in Greenwich Village, possibly at the Five Spot, based on the Ornette Coleman Quartet with Don Cherry, Charlie Haden and Billy Higgins around 1960.

References

Sphere, McClintic
Characters in American novels of the 20th century
Fictional jazz musicians
Fictional characters based on real people